Ooregum Gold Mining Co of India v Roper [1892] AC 125 is an old and controversial English company law case concerning shares. It concerns the rule that shares should not be issued "at a discount" on the price at which they were issued.

Under United Kingdom company law the rule is now codified in Companies Act 2006, sections 552 and 580.

Facts
The Ooregum Gold Mining Co of India issued 120,000 shares at £1 each. Shareholders said they wanted to sell on the shares for 5 shillings, (i.e. 25 new pence) one quarter of the value the shares were issued at, but that the buyers would be credited with a full £1 in the company. This would mean that shareholders would get a 15 shilling (75 new pence) discount. At the time of the litigation, the share price stood at £2 14s. The shareholders at the time of the purchase (who now wanted money to pay off a debenture) even though they had voted for the issue, then turned around to the buyers and argued that shares were prohibited from being issued at a discount, and that the transaction was void.

Judgment
The House of Lords agreed that shares must not be issued at a discount. It was concerned with the potential effects on creditors. Although it is arguable that any capital increase would benefit creditors (hence speaking in favour of not preventing issue at a discount), the Lords held the proper technical route would be for the company to reduce the nominal value of the shares (as seen in the later case of Greenhalgh v Arderne Cinemas Ltd). Lord Halsbury LC said the following.

Lord Watson noted that otherwise, ‘so long as the company honestly regards the consideration as fairly representing the nominal value of the shares in cash, its estimate ought not to be critically examined.’

See also

UK company law

Notes

References

United Kingdom company case law
House of Lords cases
1892 in case law
1892 in British law
Gold in India
Mining in India